Mordellistena hoberlandti is a beetle in the genus Mordellistena of the family Mordellidae. It was described in 1983 by Horák.

References

hoberlandti
Beetles described in 1983